The Muslim Shaikh (Punjabi (Shahmukhi): مسلم شیخ) are a community found in the Sindh  province of Pakistan. The Shah Khel community of the  Khyber Pakhtunkhwa, has similar roots.

There are a number of traditions as to the origin of the Muslim Shaikhs. Most of these carry its history back to Balmik, as the ancestor of the tribe. Many members of the Hindu Dalit community converted to Christianity during the British Raj. After the independence of Pakistan in 1947, many of the Christian accepted Islam and they known as Deendar. Dīn means religion and Dar means follower in Urdu language.

During the 19th century, many Hindus converted to Islam, especially in the western parts of Punjab, and the Khyber Pakhtunkhwa.

They were merchants of the village communities, and used to live in huts at a distance from the village. Their job included collecting taxes from houses. But by the 19th century, most of them had taken to agricultural work.

Language
They speak various dialects of Punjabi and/or Sindhi, depending where they reside.

Present circumstances
A recent report on the conditions of the Shah Khel community came to this conclusion:

"The respondents in this village claim to have settled in this village over 200 years ago. They live in a cluster of 30 houses 300 yards from the main houses of the village. The houses used to number 200 at first. Their people used to earn from agricultural and livestock work. Some went to the city and made some savings. Now the community is divided between the richer ones who do the livestock business and live outside the village in nearby cities, and the others who are permanent residents and do agricultural and domestic work. The wealthier community members who left the village still come back to marry their children within the clan. They get free wood and milk from the landlord on weddings and deaths." It is further found that many Shah Khel were still involved in their traditional occupation of begging.

Shah Khel also suffer from being bonded labourers, as a number of recent studies have shown.

See also
 Deendar
 Halalkhor
 Haral Chuhra

References

Punjabi tribes
Social groups of Pakistan
Surnames
Shaikh clans
Social groups of Punjab, Pakistan